The 2018 Famous Idaho Potato Bowl was a college football bowl game played on December 21, 2018. It was the 22nd edition of the Famous Idaho Potato Bowl, and one of the 2018–19 bowl games concluding the 2018 FBS football season. The game was sponsored by the Idaho Potato Commission.

Teams
The game matched the Western Michigan Broncos, from the Mid-American Conference, and the BYU Cougars, an independent team. The programs previously had met five times, most recently in 1970, with BYU holding a 3–2 edge.

Western Michigan Broncos

Western Michigan received and accepted a bid to the Famous Idaho Potato Bowl on December 2. The Broncos entered the bowl with a 7–5 record (5–3 in conference). This was Western Michigan's second appearance in the Famous Idaho Potato Bowl, having lost to Air Force in the 2014 edition.

BYU Cougars

BYU received and accepted a bid to the Famous Idaho Potato Bowl on December 2. The independent Cougars entered the bowl with a 6–6 record. BYU became the first independent team to play in the Famous Idaho Potato Bowl.

Potato Bowl MVP
Zach Wilson won Potato bowl MVP after a stellar performance completing all 18 of his passes for 317 yards and 4 touchdowns.

Game summary

Scoring summary

Statistics

References

External links
 Box score at ESPN

Famous Idaho Potato Bowl
Famous Idaho Potato Bowl
Famous Idaho Potato Bowl
Famous Idaho Potato Bowl
BYU Cougars football bowl games
Western Michigan Broncos football bowl games